Michael Brunswick Ritchie (November 28, 1938 – April 16, 2001) was an American film director, producer, and writer of films with comical or satirical leanings, such as The Candidate and Smile. He scored  commercial successes directing sports films, like Downhill Racer and The Bad News Bears, and Chevy Chase's Fletch comedies and Eddie Murphy's The Golden Child.

Personal life
Ritchie was born in Waukesha, Wisconsin, the son of Patricia (née Graney) and Benbow Ferguson Ritchie.  His family later moved to Berkeley, California, where his father was a professor of experimental psychology at the University of California at Berkeley 
and his mother was the art and music librarian for the city. He attended Berkeley High School before becoming interested in film, and was accepted at Harvard University following high school. He told Robert Redford's biographer, author Michael Feeney Callan, that academic interest in film culture was the basis and drive for his career. In 1994, Ritchie purchased the hacienda-style house at 12305 Fifth Helena Drive, in the Brentwood district of Los Angeles, where Marilyn Monroe died in 1962. He bought the property for $995,000 and it became his Los Angeles family base. Also in 1994, Ritchie moved to Manhattan with his wife, Jimmie B. Ritchie, and daughters, Lillian (b. 1986) and Miriam (b. 1988). His additional children include a son, Steven (b. 1973); daughters Lauren (b. 1966) and Jessica (b. 1973), and two stepchildren, Nelly Bly and Billy Bly. His sister, Elsie Ritchie, acted in two of his films: The Candidate and Smile.

Career
While at Harvard, Ritchie directed the original production of the Arthur Kopit play, Oh Dad, Poor Dad, Mamma's Hung You in the Closet and I'm Feelin' So Sad in Cambridge, Massachusetts. This led Robert Saudek to offer him a job, and Ritchie worked on several TV series prior to his film debut in 1969 with Downhill Racer.

In 1970, Ritchie worked for John V. Tunney's senate election campaign; Tunney was the basis for Robert Redford's character in Ritchie's Oscar-winning film, The Candidate.

As a director, Ritchie's output was highly varied.  Although originally known for his sports films and satires in the 1970s, such as The Candidate and The Bad News Bears, he became more known for his broad comedies in the 1980s, such as Fletch and The Golden Child.

Ritchie also briefly pursued a career as an author, writing Please Stand By: A Prehistory of Television, a nonfiction book about the experimental period of the television industry from the 1920s through the 1940s.

Death and legacy
Chris Willman of Entertainment Weekly wrote, "It’s difficult to think of any director, ever, who had a more consistently uneven career."  According to Mark LeFanu, his films were recognized as "unpretentious, closely observed, finely textured works...there comes a point when, looking back, one sees that their consistency itself – consistent excellence – is telling us something: something about the way that cinema itself is able to move out and look around." Ritchie died from complications related to prostate cancer.

Filmography

Films

Television films

Television series

References

External links
 

1938 births
2001 deaths
American television directors
Berkeley High School (Berkeley, California) alumni
Comedy film directors
Deaths from cancer in New York (state)
Deaths from prostate cancer
Harvard University alumni
People from Waukesha, Wisconsin
Film directors from Wisconsin
People from Berkeley, California
People from Brentwood, Los Angeles
Film directors from Los Angeles